La Familia Network (LFN) was a Spanish language, family-oriented television network based in Harlingen, Texas. It was available on Time Warner Cable until October 4, 2015.

History 
La Familia Network was created by Clark Ortiz from Harlingen, Texas. After a brief relationship with The Inspiration Network, La Familia Network moved on its own to create relationships with the cable, satellite and IPTV companies - something the Inspiration Networks wouldn't do.  Fe-TV was closed by Kevin Ortiz in order to focus on the local church Faith Pleases God.

References

Companies based in Texas
Spanish-language television networks in the United States
Television channels and stations established in 1994
Television channels and stations disestablished in 2015
1994 establishments in Texas
Defunct television networks in the United States
2015 disestablishments in Texas